Leeds and York Partnerships NHS Foundation Trust became an NHS Foundation Trust in August 2007. It merged with mental health and learning disability services from NHS North Yorkshire and York in February 2012 becoming Leeds and York Partnership NHS Foundation Trust.

It provides specialist mental health and learning disability services across Yorkshire, England.  In May 2015 it lost a £190 million contract to provide mental health and learning disability services in the Vale of York and specialist services in North Yorkshire which it had run since 2012.  The decision to award the contract to Tees, Esk and Wear Valleys NHS Foundation Trust was described by the trust as unfair, and they complained to Monitor (NHS). Dr Mark Hayes of the Vale of York Clinical Commissioning Group defended the decision, saying staff and patients would not be affected by the change of provider and that it would mean York has the same provider as the rest of North Yorkshire.

It hosts the North of England Commercial Procurement Collaborative, an NHS organisation set up in 2007 to provide legal advice to NHS Trusts.  Bevan Brittan, Browne Jacobson, Capsticks, Cater Leydon Millard, DAC Beachcroft, Hempsons, Hill Dickinson, Kennedys, Mills & Reeve, Sintons, Ward Hadaway and Weightmans are on the panel.

In 2016 the Care Quality Commission rated the Trust as needing to improve, especially in relation to its services in York.

See also
 List of NHS trusts

References

NHS foundation trusts
Health in Yorkshire